The 1963 Omloop Het Volk was the 18th edition of the Omloop Het Volk cycle race and was held on 2 March 1963. The race started and finished in Ghent. The race was won by René Van Meenen.

General classification

References

1963
Omloop Het Nieuwsblad
Omloop Het Nieuwsblad